Qaleh Juq-e Sabalan (also Romanized as Qal‘eh Jūq-e Sabalān; also known as Qal‘eh Jūq) is a village in Sardabeh Rural District, in the Central District of Ardabil County, Ardabil Province, Iran. At the 2006 census, its population was 796, in 181 families.

References 

Towns and villages in Ardabil County